The Real Macaw is an album by Graham Parker, released in 1983.

Critical reception
Rolling Stone called The Real Macaw "a propulsive, brilliantly sung LP." Trouser Press called the album "a disc that is watered down and should have been harder." PopMatters wrote that "even with some dated-sounded keyboard work, it's right up there with the best pop-oriented rock albums of all time."

Track listing
All songs written by Graham Parker

 "Just Like a Man"
 "You Can't Take Love for Granted"
 "Glass Jaw"
 "Passive Resistance"
 "Sounds Like Chains"
 "Life Gets Better"
 "A Miracle a Minute"
 "Beyond a Joke"
 "Last Couple on the Dance Floor"
 "Anniversary"
 "(Too Late) The Smart Bomb"

Charts

Personnel
Graham Parker - lead and backing vocals, "blue and hollow" guitars
Brinsley Schwarz - "Orange and black" guitars
George Small - keyboards
Kevin Jenkins - bass
Gilson Lavis - drums

Additional musicians
Sarah Larson - violin
Mel Collins - saxophone
Morris Pert - percussion
Andy Ebsworth - Linn drum programming

Studio Personnel
Phil Thornalley - Recording and Mixing Engineer 

Recorded at Ramport Studio, Battersea

Mixed at Eel Pie Island Studio, Twickenham

References

1985 albums
Graham Parker albums
Arista Records albums
Albums produced by David Kershenbaum